Erlenbach–Winkel is one of the 111 serial sites of the UNESCO World Heritage Site Prehistoric pile dwellings around the Alps, of which are 56 located in Switzerland.

Geography 
The site is located on Zürichsee lakeshore in Winkel, a locality of the municipality of Erlenbach in the Canton of Zürich in Switzerland. The settlement comprises , and the buffer zone including the lake area comprises  in all.

Description 
From the Early Bronze Age (20th/19th centuries BC) numerous finds and ground plans of Corded Ware culture houses are of particular interest. The latter are associated with material from the final phase of the Corded Ware culture marking a hiatus of 600 years until the Early Bronze Age in the period of constructing pile dwellings north of the Alps. In a European context, the house constructions are of particular interest, because the Corded Ware culture is defined mainly by its grave finds, whereas settlements are usually missing from the archaeological records.

Protection 
As well as being part of the 56 Swiss sites of the UNESCO World Heritage Site Prehistoric pile dwellings around the Alps, the settlement is also listed in the Swiss inventory of cultural property of national and regional significance as a Class A object of national importance. Hence, the area is provided as a historical site under federal protection, within the meaning of the Swiss Federal Act on the nature and cultural heritage (German: Bundesgesetz über den Natur- und Heimatschutz NHG) of 1 July 1966. Unauthorised researching and purposeful gathering of findings represent a criminal offense according to Art. 24.

See also 
 Prehistoric pile dwellings around Zürichsee

Literature 
 Peter J. Suter, Helmut Schlichtherle et al.: Pfahlbauten – Palafittes – Palafitte. Palafittes, Biel 2009. .
 Beat Eberschweiler: Ur- und frühgeschichtliche Verkehrswege über den Zürichsee: Erste Ergebnisse aus den Taucharchäologischen Untersuchungen beim Seedamm. In: Mitteilungen des Historischen Vereins des Kantons Schwyz, Volume 96, Schwyz 2004.

References

External links 

 

Prehistoric pile dwellings in Switzerland
Erlenbach, Switzerland
Lake Zurich
Cultural property of national significance in the canton of Zürich
Archaeological sites in Switzerland
Corded Ware culture